The Computer Language Benchmarks Game (formerly called The Great Computer Language Shootout) is a free software project for comparing how a given subset of simple algorithms can be implemented in various popular programming languages.

The project consists of:

 A set of very simple algorithmic problems
 Various implementations to the above problems in various programming languages
 A set of unit tests to verify that the submitted implementations solve the problem statement
 A framework for running and timing the implementations
 A website to facilitate the interactive comparison of the results

Supported languages
Due to resource constraints, only a small subset of common programming languages are supported, up to the discretion of the game's operator.

Metrics
The following aspects of each given implementation are measured:
 overall user runtime
 peak memory allocation
 gzip'ped size of the solution's source code
 sum of total CPU time over all threads
 individual CPU utilization

It is common to see multiple solutions in the same programming language for the same problem. This highlights that within the constraints of a given language, a solution can be given which is either of high abstraction, is memory efficient, is fast, or can be parallelized better.

Benchmark programs
It was a design choice from the start to only include very simple toy problems, each providing a different kind of programming challenge.
This provides users of the Benchmark Game the opportunity to scrutinize the various implementations.
 binary-trees
 chameneos-redux
 fannkuch-redux
 fasta
 k-nucleotide
 mandelbrot
 meteor-contest
 n-body
 pidigits
 regex-redux
 reverse-complement
 spectral-norm
 thread-ring

History
The project was known as The Great Computer Language Shootout until 2007.

A port for Windows was maintained separately between 2002 and 2003.

The sources have been archived on GitLab.

There are also older forks on GitHub.

The project is continuously evolving. The list of supported programming languages is updated approximately once per year, following market trends. Users can also submit improved solutions to any of the problems or suggest testing methodology refinement.

Caveats
The developers themselves highlight the fact that those doing research should exercise caution when using such microbenchmarks:

Impact

The benchmark results have uncovered various compiler issues. Sometimes a given compiler failed to process unusual, but otherwise grammatically valid constructs. At other times, runtime performance was shown to be below expectations, which prompted compiler developers to revise their optimization capabilities.

Various research articles have been based on the benchmarks, its results and its methodology.

See also
 Benchmark (computing)
 Comparison of programming languages

References

External links
 

Programming language comparisons
Benchmarks (computing)